Baldwin Township is a township in Allegheny County, Pennsylvania, United States. The population was 1,984 at the 2020 census, a decrease from the figure of 1,992 tabulated in 2010.

Geography

Surrounding communities
Baldwin Township has four borders, including the Pittsburgh neighborhoods of Brookline to the north and Overbrook to the northeast and southeast.  The other two borders are with Castle Shannon to the south and southwest and Mt. Lebanon to the west.

History
The area that would become Baldwin Township was originally settled around 1780.  The Allegheny County Court of Quarter Sessions established Baldwin Township on February 24, 1844, from Upper St. Clair, Lower St. Clair, Jefferson, and Mifflin townships.  The area was named for Henry Baldwin, a Pittsburgh lawyer who served as an Associate Justice of the United States Supreme Court from 1830 until his death in 1844.

Baldwin Township was originally 10,550 acres (43 km2) and consisted of the present-day Pittsburgh neighborhoods of Carrick, Hays, Brookline, and Overbrook, along with the present-day municipalities of Brentwood, Whitehall, Castle Shannon, and Baldwin Borough.

The coal seam lying underneath Baldwin Township made mining the township's largest industry.  The township was also home to the first glass factories in Allegheny County.  Agriculture was an important part of Baldwin Township's economy from 1753 to 1876. Its most well-known agricultural exports were cherries and whiskey (many citizens of Baldwin Township were part of the Whiskey Rebellion).

The township continued to thrive until the late 19th century.  Due to the lack of maintenance throughout the township's roads, residents of many areas broke off to form their own municipalities.  In 1901, 201 acres (0.8 km2) became the Pittsburgh neighborhood of Hays.  Three years later in 1904, Carrick and Brookline became Pittsburgh wards, taking with them 1,058 acres (4 km2) and 138 acres (0.6 km2), respectively.  From 1915 - 1951, approximately 8,700 acres (35 km2) of the original Baldwin Township broke off to become the municipalities of Brentwood, Castle Shannon, Mt. Lebanon, Whitehall, and Baldwin Borough.  The City of Pittsburgh annexed an additional area of land that is now the city's Overbrook neighborhood.

Today, only 400 of the township's original 10,550 acres (43 km2) remain.  Historians calculate that if Baldwin Township had never been divided, it would now be the second largest community in Allegheny County, with a population of over 100,000.

Government and Politics

Demographics

As of the census of 2000, there were 2,244 people, 869 households, and 637 families residing in the township.  The population density was 4,148.9 people per square mile (1,604.5/km2).  There were 880 housing units at an average density of 1,627.0/sq mi (629.2/km2).  The racial makeup of the township was 98.62% White, 0.27% African American, 0.58% Asian, 0.13% from other races, and 0.40% from two or more races. Hispanic or Latino of any race were 0.40% of the population.

There were 869 households, out of which 28.7% had children under the age of 18 living with them, 61.3% were married couples living together, 9.9% had a female householder with no husband present, and 26.6% were non-families. 23.8% of all households were made up of individuals, and 9.9% had someone living alone who was 65 years of age or older.  The average household size was 2.50 and the average family size was 2.98.

In the township the population was spread out, with 22.7% under the age of 18, 4.3% from 18 to 24, 29.2% from 25 to 44, 23.8% from 45 to 64, and 19.9% who were 65 years of age or older.  The median age was 41 years. For every 100 females there were 88.7 males.  For every 100 females age 18 and over, there were 83.5 males.

The median income for a household in the township was $45,071, and the median income for a family was $52,200. Males had a median income of $38,750 versus $29,342 for females. The per capita income for the township was $20,918.  About 3.3% of families and 4.7% of the population were below the poverty line, including 6.3% of those under age 18 and 3.1% of those age 65 or over.

References

External links
Township website
History of Allegheny County, Pennsylvania, Volume II, Chapter V
Historic Pittsburgh Map Collections

Townships in Allegheny County, Pennsylvania